Ŭiju County is a kun, or county, in North Pyongan Province, North Korea.  The county has an area of 420 km², and a population of 110,018 (2008 data).

Name
Ŭiju appears as Uiju in South Korea's Revised Romanization and as Yizhou in Chinese sources, as during its occupation by Mao Wenlong's forces during the Transition from Ming to Qing.

Geography
Sakchu county and Kusŏng lie to the east; Sŏnch'ŏn and Ch'ŏlsan counties to the south; and Ryongch'ŏn county and Sinŭiju to the west. To the north, Ŭiju shares a border with China.

Administrative divisions
Ŭiju county is divided into 1 ŭp (town), 2 rodongjagu (workers' districts) and 17 ri (villages):

Transportation
Ŭiju county is served by the Tŏkhyŏn Line of the Korean State Railway. There is also an airport, Uiju Airfield (ICAO airport code: ZKUJ).

1980 earthquake
Ŭiju earthquake was a 5.3 magnitude earthquake that occurred in Ŭiju County in 1980. It is among the largest earthquakes by magnitude recorded in the Korean Peninsula since South Korea began official earthquake observation in 1978.

See also
Geography of North Korea
Ojok-tong

References

External links

Counties of North Pyongan